Martine Le Coz (born 13 September 1955 Charente) is a French novelist.
She won the 2001 Prix Renaudot, for Céleste.

Works

Novels
Gilles de Raiz, la confession imaginaire, 1989; Éditions du Rocher, 2002, 
Le Pharaon qui n'avait pas d'ombre, 1992; Iuniverse.Com, 1999, 
La Palette du jeune Turner, Éditions du Rocher, 1993, 
Le Journal de l'autre, Rocher, 1995, 
Les Confins du jour, Editions du Rocher, 1996, 
Léo, la nuit, Editions du Rocher, 1997, 
Le Nègre et la Méduse, 1999; Le Serpent à Plumes, 2005, 
Céleste, Rocher, 2001, 
Nos lointains et nos proches, Albin Michel, 2004, 
La Reine écarlate, Albin Michel, 2007, 
Le Jardin d'Orient, Michalon, 2008, 
L’Homme électrique, Michalon, 2009,

Poetry
Le Chagrin du zèbre, Editions du Rocher, 1998, 
Le Rire de l'arbre au milieu du jardin, Rocher, 2000, 
La Couronne de vent, Al Manar, 2009, 
Signe de ferveur noir, 2010

Non-fiction
Hypnose et Graphologie,avec Erich Lancaster,Editions du Rocher, 1991,
Gilles de Raiz, ignoble et chrétien, 1995
Le briquet, Editions du Rocher, 1997, 
Catherine d'Alexandrie ou la Philosophie défaite par la foi, Editions du Rocher, 1999, 
La Beauté Rocher, 2000, 
Visages des voyageurs, 2002
Hosana!, Michalon, 2003, 
La Pierre et le Souffle, Farrago, 2004,

References

External links
"Entretien avec Martine Le Coz", Ecrit vains, Brigit Bontour
CÉLESTE, de MARTINE LE COZ

1955 births
People from Charente
Living people
Prix Renaudot winners
French women novelists
20th-century French novelists
21st-century French novelists
21st-century French women writers
20th-century French women writers